Ernst Catenhusen (26 October 1841 in Ratzeburg – 9 May 1918 in Berlin) was a German conductor and composer, also active in the United States.

Life 
Catenhusen was the son of Ratzeburg superintendent Carl Friedrich Wilhelm Catenhusen. After graduating from the Lauenburg School of Applied Sciences, he went to the University of Göttingen to study law. Instead, however, he studied philosophy, history, and literature.

He moved to Leipzig to devote himself entirely to music and moved from there to Hamburg to study for two and a half years with Ignaz Lachner. His first engagement was in 1862 in Wesel. From 1863 to 1865, he went as Kapellmeister and choir director to the New Town Theater in Riga, where he was also the conductor of the Liedertafel. Then he was the first Kapellmeister successively in Lübeck, Königsberg, Chemnitz, Cologne, Hamburg (at the Thalia Theater) and Berlin (Friedrich-Wilhelm-Städtisches Theater).

In 1881, he was hired for the Thalia Theater in New York City and changed the following year as Kapellmeister and senior director at the new Casino Theater. In 1884, he was conductor of the Musikverein in Milwaukee, where he conducted in 1886 the great song festival of the North American Singing Association. From 1887, he worked as a singing teacher and composer in Chicago.

Later he returned to Germany.

Works 
 Ännchen von Tharau, Romantic opera in three acts (1870, libretto by Julius Stinde, performed in Lübeck), libretto digitized
 Musik zu Schauspielen: 
 Ouverture for Jungfrau von Orleans
 Cantata for Befreiungsschlacht bei Leipzig
 String quartet

Further reading 
 Moritz Rudolph (Hrg.): Rigaer Theater- und Tonkünstler-Lexikon: nebst Geschichte des Rigaer Theaters und der Musikalischen Gesellschaft. Riga: Kymmel 1890, S. 35

References 

German conductors (music)
German composers
1841 births
1918 deaths